Cicletanine is a furopyridine low-ceiling diuretic drug, usually used in the treatment of hypertension.  The drug is manufactured by Ipsen and marketed by Recordati (in France) under the trade name Tenstaten.

It appears to be more potent in salt-sensitive hypertension.

Mechanism
It can inhibit protein kinase C.

References

External links
Ipsen Corporation

Diuretics
Furopyridines
Phenols
Chlorobenzenes